This is a list of the number-one songs of 2020 in Mexico. The airplay chart rankings are published by Monitor Latino, based on airplay across radio stations in Mexico using the Radio Tracking Data, LLC in real time. Charts are compiled from Monday to Sunday.

The streaming charts are published by AMPROFON (Asociación Mexicana de Productores de Fonogramas y Videogramas).

Chart history (airplay)
Besides the General chart, Monitor Latino publishes "Pop", "Popular" (Regional Mexican music) and "Anglo" charts. Monitor Latino provides two lists for each of these charts: the "Audience" list ranked the songs according to the estimated number of people that listened to them on the radio during the week.
The "Tocadas" (Spins) list ranked the songs according to the number of times they were played on the radio during the week.

General

Pop

Popular

Anglo

Chart history (streaming)

See also
List of number-one albums of 2020 (Mexico)

References

2020
Number-one songs
Mexico